The Latrobe Gate (also known as Main Gate, Washington Navy Yard) is a historic gatehouse located at the Washington Navy Yard in Southeast Washington, D.C. Built in 1806 and substantially altered in 1881, the ceremonial entrance to the U.S. Navy's oldest shore establishment is an example of Greek Revival and Italianate architecture. It was designed by the second Architect of the Capitol Benjamin Henry Latrobe, whose works include St. John's Episcopal Church, the Baltimore Basilica, and the United States Capitol. The Latrobe Gate is one of the nation's oldest extant examples of Greek Revival architecture. It was added to the National Register of Historic Places on August 14, 1973, and is a contributing property to the Washington Navy Yard's status as a National Historic Landmark.

History

The Washington Navy Yard was established by an Act of Congress on July 23, 1799. Three years later, President Thomas Jefferson chose Latrobe to design a dry dock and ship repair facility for what was to become an active and strategically located naval yard. Although Congress rejected Latrobe's building plans, the architect was designated "Engineer of the Navy Department" in 1804. Plans for the Main Gate were approved by Secretary of the Navy Robert Smith in 1805, and construction lasted from that year until 1806. Latrobe's Greek Revival design was considered daring and thus criticized by traditionalist architects. William Thornton, the first Architect of the Capitol, described the gate as a "monument to bad taste and design". Thornton predicted that "not until extinction of time will such an arch ever be made again", but the Greek Revival style became popular with 19th-century American architects. The style was considered symbolic of the young nation's democracy, a political system that originated in Ancient Greece.

During the War of 1812, Washington, D.C., was invaded by British forces. The Navy Yard was a primary target during the attack, and was burned along with much of the city in 1814. The gate was one of only three structures at the Navy Yard not destroyed during the fire.

In 1881, a Marine barracks was constructed around and over the Main Gate. The brick, Italianate structure is two stories high above the gate and three stories high on each side of the gate. It is the oldest continuously manned Marine guardhouse in the United States. It is located four blocks south of the Marine Barracks Washington. The Marines manning the Latrobe Gate are responsible for raising and lowering the American flag outside the Chief of Naval Operations' (CNO's) house.

See also
 List of works by Benjamin Henry Latrobe
 National Register of Historic Places listings in Washington, D.C.

References

External links

Washington Navy Yard
Barracks on the National Register of Historic Places
Gates in the United States
Residential buildings completed in 1806
Buildings of the United States government in Washington, D.C.
Military facilities on the National Register of Historic Places in Washington, D.C.
Buildings and structures on the National Register of Historic Places in Washington, D.C.
Historic district contributing properties in Washington, D.C.
Gate
Greek Revival architecture in Washington, D.C.
Italianate architecture in Washington, D.C.
1806 establishments in Washington, D.C.